Choghuki may refer to:
 Choghuki-ye Olya
 Rustai-ye Choghuki